William Francis Angus (born 16 April 1999) is an English former first-class cricketer. 

Angus was born at Bishop Auckland in April 1999. He was educated in County Durham at both Parkside Academy and Durham Sixth Form Centre, before going up to Durham University. While studying at Durham, he made a single appearance in first-class cricket for Durham MCCU against Northamptonshire at Northampton in 2019. Batting once in the match, he was dismissed without scoring in the Durham MCCU first innings by Rob Keogh, while with his off break bowling he took 2 wickets in Northamptonshire's first innings, dismissing Ricardo Vasconcelos and Adam Rossington to take figures of 2 for 71. In addition to playing first-class cricket, Angus has also played minor counties cricket for Northumberland.

References

External links

1999 births
Living people
Sportspeople from Bishop Auckland
Cricketers from County Durham
Alumni of Durham University
English cricketers
Northumberland cricketers
Durham MCCU cricketers